Alternaria cinerariae is a fungal plant pathogen.

References

External links
 Index Fungorum
 USDA ARS Fungal Database

cinerariae
Fungal plant pathogens and diseases
Fungi described in 1931